A linear settlement is a (normally small to medium-sized) settlement or group of buildings that is formed in a long line. Many of these settlements are formed along a transport route, such as a road, river, or canal. Others form due to physical restrictions, such as coastlines, mountains, hills or valleys. Linear settlements may have no obvious centre.

In the case of settlements built along a route, the route predated the settlement, and then the settlement grew along the transport route. Often, it is only a single street with houses on either side of the road. Mileham, Norfolk, England is an example of this pattern. Later development may add side turnings and districts away from the original main street. Places such as Southport, England developed in this way.

A linear settlement is in contrast with ribbon development, which is the outward spread of an existing town along a main street, and with a nucleated settlement, which is a group of buildings clustered around a central point. 

Particular types of linear settlements are linear village, chain village, street village (Polish:  ulicówka; German: Straßendorf, Lithuanian: gatvinis kaimas, French:  village-rue), and some others. Different countries have various classifications of linear settlements. 

In 2022, construction began on The Line, a  linear city in Saudi Arabia.

See also 
 Linear city (Soria design)
 Reihendorf
 Ribbon farm
 Zeilendorf

References

Further reading
 

Urban planning
Types of populated places
City layout models
Rural geography
Settlement geography
Types of village